The Luther Bible is a German language Bible translation by the Protestant reformer Martin Luther. A New Testament translation by Luther was first published in September 1522, and the completed Bible, containing a translation of the Old and New Testaments with Apocrypha, in 1534. Luther continued to make improvements to the text until 1545. It was the first full translation of the Bible into German that made use of Greek texts, not just their Latin Vulgate translations.

Luther did not translate the entire Bible by himself; rather he relied on a team of translators and helpers that included Philip Melanchthon, a scholar of Koine Greek who motivated and assisted Luther's New Testament translation from Greek, and Matthäus Aurogallus, a linguist and scholar of Hebrew. One of the textual bases of the New Testament translation was the Greek version recently published by the Dutch Catholic humanist Erasmus of Rotterdam and called the Novum Instrumentum omne (1516).

The project absorbed Luther's later years. The publication of Luther's Bible was a decisive moment in the spread of literacy in early modern Germany, promoting the development of non-local forms of language and exposing all speakers to forms of German from outside their own areas. Thanks to the then recently invented printing press, the result was widely disseminated and contributed significantly to the development of today's modern High German language.

Previous German translations
A number of Bible translations into German, both manuscript and printed, were produced prior to Luther's birth. Starting around the year 1460 at least a dozen printed translations were published in various German dialects. However they were translations from the Latin Vulgate rather than from the original Hebrew and Greek.

Luther's New Testament translation
While he was sequestered in the Wartburg Castle (1521–22), Luther began to translate the New Testament from Greek and Latin into German in order to make it more accessible to all the people of the "Holy Roman Empire of the German nation". Known as the "September Bible", this translation included only the New Testament and was printed in September 1522. Luther was assisted by Melanchton in translating from the Greek text, using Erasmus' second edition (1519) of the Greek New Testament, known as the Textus Receptus. Luther also published the Bible in the small octavo format. Like Erasmus, Luther had learned some Greek at the Latin schools led by the Brethren of the Common Life (Erasmus in Deventer, the Netherlands; and Luther in Magdeburg, Germany). These lay brothers had added Greek as a new subject to their curriculum in the late 15th century. At that time Greek was seldom taught even at universities.

To help him in translating into contemporary German, Luther made forays into nearby towns and markets to listen to people speaking. He wanted to ensure their comprehension by translating as closely as possible to their contemporary language usage. His translation was published in September 1522, six months after he had returned to Wittenberg. In the opinion of the 19th-century theologian and church historian Philip Schaff,

Publication of the complete Bible translation
The translation of the entire Bible into German was published in a six-part edition in 1534, a collaborative effort of Luther and many others such as Johannes Bugenhagen, Justus Jonas, Caspar Creuziger, Philipp Melanchthon, Matthäus Aurogallus, and Georg Rörer. Luther worked on refining the translation up to his death in 1546; he had worked on the edition that was printed that year.

There were 117 original woodcuts included in the 1534 edition issued by the Hans Lufft press in Wittenberg. They reflected the recent trend (since 1522) of including artwork to reinforce the textual message.

Luther's Bible was a bestseller in its time. About 200,000 copies in hundreds of reprinted editions appeared before Luther died in 1546. However, the book remained too expensive for most Lutherans; an unbound copy of the complete 1534 Bible cost the equivalent of a month's wages for the average laborer. Instead, the Bible was bought by churches, pastors, and schools.

Mistranslations and controversies
Luther added the word "alone" (allein in German) to Romans 3:28 controversially so that it read: "So now we hold, that man is justified without the help of the works of the law, alone through faith" The word "alone" does not appear in the Greek texts, but Luther defended his translation by maintaining that the adverb "alone" was required both by idiomatic German and the apostle Paul's intended meaning according to his interpretation, and that sola had been used in Western theological tradition before him.

Many Protestant scholars have noted the bias in Luther's translation, including Anglican apologist Alister McGrath:

According to the Evangelical Church in Germany (Evangelische Kirche in Deutschland), Luther relied heavily on the Vulgate and not on the original Greek: "Luther translated according to the Latin text." The consensus of the modern Lutheran church is that Luther overlaid his pre-existing theology onto the text, particularly on the book of Romans. The 2017 version has added footnotes on Romans 1:17, Romans 2:13, Romans 3:21, and Romans 3:28 that warn about the deliberate mistranslations Luther committed.

Karl-Heinz Göttert, a professor of Medieval Studies at the University of Cologne, in reference to his book Luther's Bible - History of a Hostile Takeover noted:

Luther did not know ancient Greek well, and when he referenced the Greek New Testament, he relied on his friend Melanchthon and a number of other philologists. Significant changes correcting Luther’s translations were made in the 2017 version of the Luther Bible.

Luther also added German legal terminology which is not found in the original text, for example  in Matthew 23.5. There were also many understandable mistranslations due to a lack of knowledge, such as in Psalms 104 where he mistranslated chamois as "rabbit" because he did not know what a chamois was.

View of canonicity

Initially Luther had a low view of the Old Testament book of Esther and of the New Testament books of Hebrews, James, Jude, and the Revelation of John. He called the Letter of James "an epistle of straw", finding little in it that pointed to Christ and his saving work. He also had harsh words for the Revelation of John, saying that he could "in no way detect that the Holy Spirit produced it". In his translation of the New Testament, Luther moved Hebrews and James out of the usual order, to join Jude and the Revelation at the end, and differentiated these from the other books which he considered "the true and certain chief books of the New Testament. The four which follow have from ancient times had a different reputation." His views on some of these books changed in later years, and became more positive.

Luther chose to place the books he considered Biblical apocrypha between the Old and New Testaments. These books and addenda to Biblical canon of the Old Testament are found in the ancient Greek Septuagint but not in the Hebrew Masoretic text. Luther left the translating of them largely to Philipp Melanchthon and Justus Jonas. They were not listed in the table of contents of his 1532 Old Testament, and in the 1534 Bible they were given the well-known title: "Apocrypha: These Books Are Not Held Equal to the Scriptures, but Are Useful and Good to Read". See also Development of the Christian Biblical canon.

Influence

The Luther Bible was not the first translation of the Bible into German. The previous German translation from 1350, printed by Johann Mentelin in 1466, was linguistically clumsy, partially incomprehensible, and translated exclusively from the Vulgate.

Luther's German Bible and its widespread circulation facilitated the emergence of a standard, modern German language for the German-speaking people throughout the Holy Roman Empire, an empire extending through and beyond present-day Germany. It is also considered a landmark in German literature, with Luther's vernacular style often praised by modern German sources for the forceful vigor ("kraftvolles Deutsch") with which he translated the Holy Scripture.

A large part of Luther's significance was his influence on the emergence of the German language and national identity. This stemmed predominantly from his translation of the Bible into the vernacular, which was potentially as revolutionary as canon law and the burning of the papal bull. Luther's goal was to equip every German-speaking Christian with the ability to hear the Word of God, and his completing his translation of the Old and New Testaments from Hebrew and Greek into the vernacular by 1534 was one of the most significant acts of the Reformation. 

Although Luther was not the first to attempt such a translation, his was superior to all its predecessors. Previous translations had contained poor German, and had been from the Vulgate Latin translation, i.e. translations of a translation rather than a direct translation into German from the originals. Luther sought to translate as closely to the original text as possible, but at the same time his translation was guided by how people spoke in the home, on the street, and in the marketplace. Luther's faithfulness to the language spoken by the common people was to produce a work which they could relate to. This led later German writers such as Goethe and Nietzsche to praise Luther's Bible. Moreover, the fact that the vernacular Bible was printed also enabled it to spread rapidly and be read by all. Hans Lufft, the Bible printer in Wittenberg, printed over one hundred thousand copies between 1534 and 1574, which went on to be read by millions. Luther's vernacular Bible came to be present in virtually every German-speaking Protestant's home, and there can be no doubts regarding the Biblical knowledge attained by the German common masses. Luther even had large-print Bibles made for those who had failing eyesight. German humanist Johann Cochlaeus complained that

Luther's New Testament was so much multiplied and spread by printers that even tailors and shoemakers, yea, even women and ignorant persons who had accepted this new Lutheran gospel, and could read a little German, studied it with the greatest avidity as the fountain of all truth. Some committed it to memory, and carried it about in their bosom. In a few months such people deemed themselves so learned that they were not ashamed to dispute about faith and the gospel not only with Catholic laymen, but even with priests and monks and doctors of divinity."

The spread of Luther's Bible translation had implications for the German language. The German language had developed into so many dialects that German speakers from different regions could barely understand each other. This led Luther to conclude that “I have so far read no book or letter in which the German language is properly handled. Nobody seems to care sufficiently for it; and every preacher thinks he has a right to change it at pleasure and to invent new terms." Scholars preferred to write in the Latin which they all understood. Luther's Bible translation, based primarily on his native Upper Saxon dialect and enriched with the vocabulary of German poets and chroniclers, led to a standardized German language. For this accomplishment, a contemporary of Luther's, Erasmus Alberus, labeled him the German Cicero, as he reformed not only religion but the German language also. Luther's Bible has been hailed as the first German 'classic', comparable to the English King James Version of the Bible. German-speaking Protestant writers and poets such as Klopstock, Herder and Lessing owe stylistic qualities to Luther's vernacular Bible. Luther adapted words to the capacity of the German public and through the pervasiveness of his German Bible created and spread the modern German language.

Luther's vernacular Bible also had a role in the creation of a German national identity. Because it penetrated every German-speaking Protestant home, the language of his translation became part of a German national heritage. Luther's program of exposure to the words of the Bible was extended into every sphere of daily life and work, illuminating moral considerations for Germans. It gradually became infused into the blood of the whole nation and occupied a permanent space in a German history. The popularity and influence of his translation gave Luther confidence to act as a spokesperson of a nation and as the leader of an anti-Roman movement throughout Germany. It made it possible for him to be a prophet of a new German national identity and helped form the spirit of a new epoch in German history.

In a sense the vernacular Bible also empowered and liberated all Protestants who had access to it. The existence of the translation was a public affirmation of reform, such as might deprive any elite or priestly class of exclusive control over words, as well as over the word of God. Through the translation Luther was intending to make it easier for "simple people" to understand what he was teaching. In some major controversies of the time, even some evangelicals, let alone the commoners, did not understand the reasons for disagreement; and Luther wanted to help those who were confused to see that the disagreement between himself and the Roman Catholic Church was real and had significance. So translation of the Bible would allow the common people to become aware of the issues at hand and develop an informed opinion. The common individual would thus be given the right to have a mind, spirit and opinion, to exist not as an economic functionary but as subject to complex and conflicting aspirations and motives. In this sense, Luther's vernacular Bible acted as a force towards the liberation of the German people. The combination of Luther's social teachings and the vernacular Bible undoubtedly had a role in the slow emancipation of western European society from a long phase of clerical domination. Luther gave men a new vision of perhaps the exaltation of the human self. Luther's vernacular Bible broke the domination and unity of the Roman Catholic Church in Western Europe. He had claimed Holy Scripture to be the sole authority, and through his translation every individual would be able to abide by its authority, and might nullify his or her need for a monarchical pope. As Bishop Fisher put it, Luther's Bible had “stirred a mighty storm and tempest in the church” empowering the no longer clerically dominated public.

Although not as significantly as on German linguistics, Luther's Bible also made a large impression on educational reform throughout Germany. Luther's goal of a readable, accurate translation of the Bible became a stimulus towards universal education, since everyone should be able to read in order to understand the Bible. Luther believed that mankind had fallen from grace and was ruled by selfishness, but had not lost moral consciousness: all were sinners and needed to be educated. Thus his vernacular Bible could become a means of establishing a form of law, order and morality which everyone could abide by, if all could read and understand it. The possibility of understanding the vernacular Bible allowed Luther to found a State Church and educate his followers into a law-abiding community. The Protestant states of Germany became educational states, which encouraged the spirit of teaching which was ultimately fueled by Luther's vernacular Bible.

Finally, Luther's translated Bible also had international significance in the spread of Christianity. Luther's translation influenced the English translations by William Tyndale and Myles Coverdale who in turn inspired many other translations of the Bible such as the Bishops' Bible of 1568, the Douay–Rheims Bible of 1582–1609, and the King James Version of 1611. It also inspired translations as far as Scandinavia and the Netherlands. In a metaphor, it was Luther who 'broke the walls' of translation in western Europe and once such walls had fallen, the way was open to all, including some who were quite opposed to Luther's beliefs. Luther's Bible spread its influence for the remolding of Western European culture in the ferment of the sixteenth century. The worldwide implications of the translation far surpassed the expectations of even Luther himself.

Excerpted examples

See also
Elector Bible
German Bible translations
Protestant Bible
 Permanent Exhibition Luther and the Bible at Lutherhaus Eisenach

References

Notes

Further reading
 Antliff, Mark. The Legacy of Martin Luther. Ottawa, McGill University Press, 1983
 Atkinson, James. Martin Luther and the Birth of Protestantism. Middlesex: Penguin Books, 1968
 Bindseil, H.E. and Niemeyer, H.A. Dr. Martin Luther's Bibelübersetzung nach der letzten Original-Ausgabe, kritisch bearbeitet. 7 vols. Halle, 1845–55. [The N. T. in vols. 6 and 7. A critical reprint of the last edition of Luther (1545). Niemeyer died after the publication of the first volume. Comp. the Probebibel (the revised Luther-Version), Halle, 1883. Luther's Sendbrief vom Dolmetschen und Fürbitte der Heiligen (with a letter to Wenceslaus Link, Sept. 12, 1530), in Walch, XXI. 310 sqq., and the Erl. Frkf. ed., vol. LXV. 102–123.] Free open access edition with new English translation by Howard Jones for the Taylor Institution Reformation Pamphlet Series with an introduction by Henrike Lähnemann.
 Bluhm, Heinz. Martin Luther: Creative Translator. St. Louis: Concordia Publishing House, 1965.
 Brecht, Martin. Martin Luther. 3 Volumes. James L. Schaaf, trans. Philadelphia: Fortress Press, 1985–1993.
 .
 .
 Gerrish, B.A. Reformers in Profile. Philadelphia: Fortpress Press, 1967
 Green, V.H.H. Luther and the Reformation. London: B.T. Batsford, 1964
 Grisar, Hartmann. Luther: Volume I. London: Luigi Cappadelta, 1914
 Lindberg, Carter. The European Reformations. Oxford: Blackwell, 1996
 Lyons, Martin. Books: A Living History. Thames and Hudson: 2011.
 Reu, [John] M[ichael]. Luther and the Scriptures. Columbus, OH: The Wartburg Press, 1944. [Reprint: St. Louis: Concordia Publishing House, 1980].
 .
 Ritter, Gerhard. Luther: His life and Work. New York: Harper & Row, 1963

External links

Luther Bible (1912 Edition).
Luther's Translation of the Bible in Philip Schaff's History of the Christian Church.
 
 
 Standard German Bible at World Bibles
 1912 Luther Bible at Word Project

1522 books
1534 books
16th-century Christian texts
Early printed Bibles
Works by Martin Luther
Bible translations into German
Christian terminology
1534 in Christianity